The Hopewell Presbyterian Church is a historic Presbyterian church located at the junction of Thompson Ridge Road (Orange County Route 17) and NY 302 in the Thompson Ridge section of the Town of Crawford in Orange County, New York.

The church itself was established in 1778, in a stone building 1.5 miles (2.4 km) west of the present site. It moved to the current building, a stone Gothic revival building, in 1831. In 1968, an addition was built on the back.

In 1998 it was added to the National Register of Historic Places.

References

Churches in Orange County, New York
National Register of Historic Places in Orange County, New York
19th-century Presbyterian church buildings in the United States
Churches completed in 1831
Churches on the National Register of Historic Places in New York (state)
Presbyterian churches in New York (state)
Religious organizations established in 1778
Presbyterian organizations established in the 18th century